The 1906 Dartmouth football team was an American football team that represented Dartmouth College as an independent during the 1906 college football season. In its fourth and final season under head coach Fred Folsom, the team compiled a 6–3–1 record and shut out seven of ten opponents, but was outscored by a total of 87 to 72. Quarterback John Glaze was the team captain. The team played its home games at Alumni Oval in Hanover, New Hampshire.

Schedule

References

Dartmouth
Dartmouth Big Green football seasons
Dartmouth football